The 2023 World Athletics Indoor Tour is the eighth edition of the World Athletics Indoor Tour, the highest series of international track and field indoor meetings.

The tour expanded in 2022 with the introduction of four tiers of competition labelled Gold, Silver, Bronze and Challenger in a mirror of the outdoor World Athletics Continental Tour. In 2023, the addition of further events means the tour now comprising 54 meetings in Europe, North America and Asia, and retains seven gold standard events, five in Europe and two in the United States.

For 2023 the Gold level scoring disciplines are: the men's 400m, 1500m, 60m hurdles, high jump and long jump, as well as the women's 60m, 800m, 3000/5000m, pole vault, triple jump and shot put.

Meetings

Results : Gold Tour

Men's track

Men's field

Women's track

Women's field

See also

References 

World Athletics Indoor Tour
Indoor World Tour
Indoor Tour